Kushkul (Quşkül) is a rural locality (a village) in Yevbulyaksky Selsoviet, Askinsky District, Bashkortostan, Russia. The population was 20 as of 2010. There is 1 street.

Geography 
Kushkul is located 14 km southwest of Askino (the district's administrative centre) by road. Chyornoye Ozero is the nearest rural locality.

References 

Rural localities in Askinsky District